Jean-Gabriel Diarra (12 July 1945 – 28 October 2019) was a Malian Roman Catholic bishop.

Diarra was born in Mali and was ordained to the priesthood in 1972. He served as bishop of the Roman Catholic Diocese of San, Mali, from 1987 until his death in 2019.

Notes

1945 births
2019 deaths
21st-century Roman Catholic bishops in Mali
20th-century Roman Catholic bishops in Mali
Malian Roman Catholic bishops
Roman Catholic bishops of San
21st-century Malian people